Wadena Airport  is located  south-west of Wadena, Saskatchewan, Canada.

See also 
 List of airports in Saskatchewan

References 

Registered aerodromes in Saskatchewan
Lakeview No. 337, Saskatchewan